"La forza" ("[The] Strength" or "[The] Force") is a song recorded by Estonian singer Elina Nechayeva, released on 22 January 2018 by Timulition. The track was written by Ksenia Kuchukova, Elina Nechayeva, Mihkel Mattisen and Timo Vendt. Mihkel Mattisen previously wrote the 2013 Estonian entry for Eurovision, "Et uus saaks alguse" for Birgit, while Timo Vendt did the same in 2014, writing "Amazing" for Tanya.

Eurovision Song Contest

"La forza" represented Estonia in the Eurovision Song Contest 2018 in Lisbon, Portugal after winning the pre-selection show Eesti Laul. The song competed in the final, held on 12 May 2018, after qualifying from the first semi-final. It came in eighth place with 245 points.

Track listing

Charts

Release history

References

Eurovision songs of Estonia
Eurovision songs of 2018
2018 songs
2018 singles
Italian-language songs